George Revercomb may refer to:

 George Hughes Revercomb (1929–1993), United States district judge
 George A. Revercomb (1858–1937), member of the Virginia Senate